Abdoulaye Ascofaré (born April 20, 1949) is a Malian poet and filmmaker.

Biography
Ascofaré was born in Gao, Mali in 1949 and was a radio host until 1978, when he became a teacher at the Institut National des Arts in Bamako. In 1984, he received a diploma in film studies from the All-Union State Institute of Cinematography (now the Gerasimov Institute of Cinematography) in Moscow and, in 1985, he joined the Centre National de Production Cinématographique in Bamako as a director.

Beginning in 1991, he produced several short films and, in 1997, he produced his first full-length film, Faraw, une mère des sables (Faraw, a mother of the sands), which retraces twenty-four hours in the life of a Songhaï woman. Faraw won the Golden Bayard for Artistic Creation at the 1997 Namur Film festival.

As a poet, he has published Domestiquer le rêve (Domesticating the Dream).

Filmography
 Welcome (1981)
 M’sieur Fane (1983)
 L’Hôte (1984)
 Sonatam, un quart de siècle (1990)
 Faraw, une mère des sables (1997)

External links

1949 births
Living people
Malian film directors
Malian poets
Malian male writers
Male poets
People from Gao
21st-century Malian people